Gary Pittman is a prison guard and former United States Marine Corps reservist who was received a reduction in rank from Sergeant to Private and 60 days hard labor, for his role in the death in custody of Nagem Hatab, an Iraqi he believed was involved in capturing Jessica Lynch.

Following his conviction the Federal Bureau of Prisons fired Pittman.

See also

External links
Marine Guilty of Abusing Iraqi Prisoners, Kron 4, September 2, 2004
Marine Guilty Of Prison Abuse, CBS News,  September 2, 2004

Living people
American male criminals
United States Marine Corps personnel of the Iraq War
Place of birth missing (living people)
Year of birth missing (living people)
American prison officers
United States Marines
American prisoners and detainees
Prisoners and detainees of the United States military